Tur or TUR can stand for:

Religious works
 Arba'ah Turim, a work of Jewish law, also known as the Tur
 At-Tur, the 52nd sura of the Qur'an

People
 Jacob ben Asher, author of Arba'ah Turim, also known as the Tur or the Baal Haturim
 Tur (Shahnameh), son of Fereydun and predecessor of the Turanians
 Ali Tur (1889–1977), French architect
 Nuncia María Tur, Argentinian botanist with the standard botanical author abbreviation "Tur".
 Katy Tur, NBC News Anchor
 Marc Tur (born 1994), Spanish race walker
 Mohan Singh Tur, former Jathedar (Head) of Akal Takht, Amritsar, Punjab, India.
 Naphtali Wolf Tur, poet
 Zoey Tur, former MSNBC Host and Pilot/Reporter.

Places
 Turkey, a country in Asia and Europe

Settlements
 El-Tor, Egypt, also known as Tur
 Tur, Markazi, a village in Markazi Province, Iran
 Tur, South Khorasan, a village in South Khorasan Province, Iran
 At-Tur (Mount of Olives), a Jerusalem neighborhood 
 Tuř, a municipality and village in the Czech Republic
 Tur, Kuyavian-Pomeranian Voivodeship, a village in north-central Poland
 Tur, Łódź Voivodeship, a village in central Poland
 Tur, a village in Negrești-Oaș town, Romania
 Tűr, the Hungarian name for Tiur village, Blaj, Romania

Natural features
 Tur (river), river in Romania and Hungary

Transportation
 TUR, the National Rail station code for Turkey Street railway station, London, England

Living things
 East Caucasian tur, a species of goat
 West Caucasian tur, a species of goat
 Tur (mite), a genus of mites
 Tur, Polish for aurochs (Bos primigenius)

Other
 Tur (bean)
 Tur (cuneiform), a cuneiform sign
 Turkish language (ISO 639-2 language code)
 Trans-urethral resection, a surgical procedure
 AMZ Tur, military vehicle
 Toxics use reduction
 Test Unit Ready, a SCSI command in computer science
 Tur (Bosnian-Slavic mythology)
 tur, "there" In Latvian